Rockville is an unincorporated community located in Preston County, West Virginia, United States.

It was so named for the rocky terrain.

References 

Unincorporated communities in West Virginia
Unincorporated communities in Preston County, West Virginia